The second season of the Mexican anthology television series Sin miedo a la verdad was announced by Televisa on 4 November 2018. It premiered on 8 July 2019 and ended on 9 August 2019.

This season continues the story of Manu, a brave and idealistic young man who, through a vlog, uses his skills as a hacker to help people who have been victims of injustice.

Plot 
After being in a coma for three months and after discovering that his sister Estéfani is alive and is "El Chaka", Manu wakes up and realizes that he has a bullet in his head. Manu tries to recover, when he learns that Bere left him and his vlog "Sin miedo a la verdad" has been hacked by someone who charges in exchange for helping people. Manu will have to flee from an increasingly powerful mafia cop Horacio, look for his sister, find the truth behind the disappearance of Bere and discover the secret that Lety hides, who will continue trying to recover his love. Doña Cata, as always, will remain his unconditional ally, along with Chicho and Genaro.

Cast 
 Alex Perea as Manuel "Manu" Montero
 Fermín Martínez as Horacio Escamilla
 Dacia González as Catalina Gómez
 Ligia Uriarte as Lety
 Tania Niebla as Berenice Hidalgo
 Jackie Sauza as Andrea Loera
 Ana Cristina Rubio as Estéfani Montero "El Chaka"
 Paola Miguel as María José Hidalgo
 Paco de la Fuente as Paco
 Víctor Civeira como Chicho

Episodes

Notes

References 

2019 Mexican television seasons